Jordanus (the Jordan River) was a constellation introduced in 1612 (or 1613) on a globe by Petrus Plancius and first shown in print by ‍‍Jakob Bartsch ‍in ‍his ‍book ‍‍Usus ‍Astronomicus ‍Planisphaerii ‍Stellati ‍(1624).

One end lay in the present-day Canes Venatici and then it flowed through the areas now occupied by Leo Minor and Lynx, ending near Camelopardalis.  This constellation was not adopted in the atlases of Johann Bode and fell into disuse.

References

See also
Obsolete constellations
Coelum Stellatum Christianum (Julius Schiller, 1627) Christianized the constellation Hydra as the Jordan river.

Former constellations
Constellations listed by Petrus Plancius
Dutch celestial cartography in the Age of Discovery
Astronomy in the Dutch Republic
1610s in the Dutch Republic
Jordan River
1610s beginnings